Varayeneh (also Romanized as Varāyeneh, Var Āyneh, Varāyneh, and Varā’īneh; also known as Āyeneh, Varāmīneh, Varavīna, Varvenī, and Waraweni) is a village in Gamasiyab Rural District, in the Central District of Nahavand County, Hamadan Province, Iran. At the 2006 census, its population was 1,557, in 391 families.

References 

Populated places in Nahavand County